Walter Scott Emerick (born July 11, 1973, in Hollywood, Florida) is an American country music artist, known primarily for his work with Toby Keith. In addition to penning several of Keith's singles, Emerick has also written for Sawyer Brown, George Strait, Kenny Chesney and several other artists. In 2004, Emerick was named "Songwriter of the Year" by the Nashville Songwriters Association. He recorded an album, The Coast Is Clear, for DreamWorks Records in 2003, and has charted four singles on the country charts, including a No. 24-peaking duet with Keith, "I Can't Take You Anywhere", which Keith had previously recorded on his 2001 album Pull My Chain.  "What's Up with That", performed by Emerick, was featured in the soundtrack to the film Broken Bridges.

Biography
Emerick is best known for his songwriting association with Toby Keith. Amongst his co-writing credits are the Number Ones "I'm Just Talkin' About Tonight," the Willie Nelson duet "Beer for My Horses," "I Love This Bar," "Whiskey Girl," and "As Good as I Once Was", as well as the Top Five hits "Get Drunk and Be Somebody" and "A Little Too Late." Emerick plays acoustic guitar and sings backing vocals, and as of April 2018, he is credited on 23 Toby Keith releases.

As a musician, Emerick began his songwriting career in the mid-1990s, landing cuts by Sawyer Brown, including their Top 5 single "I Don't Believe in Goodbye", which he co-wrote with Bryan White. Emerick has also released four singles of his own, including the duet "I Can't Take You Anywhere", a collaboration with Toby Keith and a debut album, The Coast Is Clear (2003), for DreamWorks Records Nashville. After the closure of DreamWorks' recording division, he signed to Toby's label, Show Dog Nashville.

Emerick is a frequent co-performer on Toby Keith's national stadium and arena tours as well as on the entertainer's USO tours to US military bases in Germany, Afghanistan, and the Persian Gulf.

Discography

Studio albums

Singles

Music videos

References

1973 births
American male singer-songwriters
American country singer-songwriters
Living people
People from Hollywood, Florida
Singer-songwriters from Florida
DreamWorks Records artists
Rising Tide Records artists
Show Dog-Universal Music artists
21st-century American singers
Country musicians from Florida
Vero Beach High School alumni
21st-century American male singers